The Hallische Musiktage are a festival specialised on contemporary music, based in Halle (Saale). Founded in 1955, it is held annually in November, the second-oldest German festival of contemporary music after the Donaueschinger Musiktage.

Hans Stieber Prize 
From 1977, the Hans Stieber Prize was given to young composers. It is named after Hans Stieber, a composer born in Naumburg who founded a music school there.

Artistic directors 
Artistic directors of the festivals included:
 Ottmar Gerster (1955–1956)
 Ernst Hermann Meyer 
 Walther Siegmund-Schultze
 Hans Jürgen Wenzel
 Gerd Domhardt (1989–1994)
 Johannes Reiche (1994–1995)
 Thomas Buchholz (from 1995)

Venues 
Festival events have been held at:
 Bartholomäuskirche
 Franckesche Stiftungen
 Handel House
 Kulturinsel Halle
 Kabarett „Die Kiebitzensteiner“
 Ulrichkirche
 Marktkirche Unser Lieben Frauen
 Moritzburg
 Neue Residenz
 Halle Opera House
 Volkspark

Artists 
The German and international ensembles and artists haveve included the orchestra of the Halle opera house, Ensemble Konfrontation, Thomas Rothert, the Universal Ensemble Berlin, Waltraut Wächter, the Kiever Kammerakademie, MDR Sinfonieorchester, Howard Arman, Georgisches Kammerorchester, Meißner Kantorei, Orion Ensemble, Hover Chamber Choir,  Ensemble Sortisatio, Leipziger Schlagzeugensemble, Rheinisches Bach-Collegium, Forum Zeitgenössischer Musik Leipzig, The Hilliard Ensemble, Elizabeth Bice, Kairos Quartett, National Chamber Orchestra of Armenia and Salzburger Harfenduo.

Premieres 
The festival premiered works by composers including:
 Reiner Bredemeyer 
 Alan Bush
 Sidney Corbett 
 Paul Dessau
 Gerd Domhardt
 Matthew Greenbaum
 Georg Katzer
 Tilo Medek
 Rainer  Riehn
 Percy M. Young
 Ruth Zechlin

Literature 
 Thomas Buchholz (ed.): Eine Kleine Chronik. LVDK Sachsen-Anhalt, Halle/Saale 2005

References

External links 
 
 Hallische Musiktage Landesverband Sachsen-Anhalt Deutscher Komponisten
 Hallische Musiktage  Halle (Saale)

Music festivals in Germany
1955 establishments in Germany